Essential Services Commission may refer to:

 Essential Services Commission (Victoria), commission of the Government of Victoria, Australia
 Essential Services Commission of South Australia, commission of the Government of South Australia